AM Taxi (formerly known as American Taxi) is an American rock band from Chicago, Illinois, United States. The band was formed by Adam Krier, Chris Smith, and Jason Schultejann in 2007. After building a base in Chicago, AM Taxi was included on multiple US tours including Vans Warped Tour.

Band members
 Adam Krier – Vocals/Guitar
 Jason Schultejann – Bass
 Chris Smith – Drums/Back-Up Vocals
 Jay Marino – Guitar/Back-Up Vocals/Mandolin

History
AM Taxi was originally known as American Taxi but changed AM Taxi because their original name was too similar to the bluegrass group, Great American Taxi.
The band was started in May 2007 by Adam Krier and Jason Schultejann of Lucky Boys Confusion and Chris Smith (Logan Square/15 Minutes Late). The trio wrote and recorded their first EP, Runaway Songs.  Shortly thereafter, John and Luke Schmitt joined the band.

AM Taxi was signed by Virgin Records in April 2009.  They produced their first LP, We Don't Stand A Chance, with producer Mike McCarthy in Austin.  The album was released on June 9, 2010.

, the group has split ways with Virgin Records.  Jay Marino (Ww Lowman, Miracle Condition, Buddy Nuisance) joined on guitar as brothers John Schmitt & Luke Schmitt parted ways from the band.

In 2013 and 2014, AM Taxi released back to back EPs, King of the Pond and Bastards of the Deep Blue Sea, to be followed up in 2016 by the Semi-Confessional mixtape. Semi-Confessional was released initially only on cassette, but is now also available digitally. It is a collection of past EP releases, alternative versions, demos, unreleased material, and collaborations.

AM Taxi released the album Shiver by Me on January 25, 2019.

Discography
Runaway Songs (EP)
The Mistake (Burning Hot Girls)
Dead Street
Tanner Boyle Vs. The 7th Grade
Shake Rattle and Stall
Paper Covers Rock
Maps And Medicine

The Good, The Bad and the Fed Up (EP)
Fed Up
Charissa
The Mistake (Acoustic)
Champagne Toast
Girl Song (Flea Circus)

We Don't Stand A Chance
Dead Street
The Mistake
Fed Up
Charissa
Tanner Boyle Vs. The 7th Grade
Paper Covers Rock
Maydays and Rosaries
Shake, Rattle and Stall
Reckless Ways
Woodpecker
Champagne Toast

King of The Pond (EP)
Central Standard TIme
It's Only DuPage Wasteland
Chelsea
Sorry You're Sick

Bastard of Deep Blue Sea (EP)
I Don't Like Your Neighborhood
Reckless in the Moonlight
Frostbit
Seams

Semi-Confessional (Mixtape)
Reckless in the Moonlight (feat. Genevieve)
Enough to Feel Like Enough
Stone Cold Virgo (feat. Michael Miguel Happoldt)
Lets Continue to Dig
Epilogues (home demo)
Shake, Rattle, and Stall (acoustic)
Bored and Raised
Out on the Fire Escape
Cant Talk My Way Into You
It's Only Dupage Wasteland

Shiver by Me
Saint Jane
Harpoon
Movie About Your Life
Swim Before You Sink (Short Time on Earth)
Fighting in Cars
L' patron
Stuck Around
Brandy Don't Let Me Down
Minute Alone
Shaken Over You
Warsaw Blues

References

External links

Musical groups from Chicago
Musical groups established in 2007
Rock music groups from Illinois
Virgin Records artists